James Russell Allison (born March 2, 1943) is a former American football running back in the American Football League. He played college football at El Camino College and San Diego State University. He was drafted with the seventh pick in the 12th round of the 1965 American Football League Draft by the San Diego Chargers and played from 1965 through 1968.

See also
List of American Football League players

References

1943 births
Living people
Sportspeople from Richmond, California
Players of American football from California
American football fullbacks
San Diego State Aztecs football players
San Diego Chargers players
El Camino Warriors football players
American Football League players